Bulathsinhalage Hubert de Silva (12 March 1926 – 3 November 1982 as එඩී ජූනියර්) [Sinhala]), popularly known by his stage name Eddie Junior, was an actor in Sri Lankan cinema and theater as well as a music composer and singer.

Personal life
Junior was born on 12 March 1926 in Negombo. His father Eddie de Silva, who was popularly known as Eddie Master was a renowned music composer. In time, he joined his father's theater troupe as a composer and actor. There he met actress Pearl Vasudevi; they married in 1940. The couple has one daughter, Sujeewa Lalee. Sujeewa also acted in few films including maiden acting in Sithijaya. Vasudevi died on 19 June 1987 at the age of 72 following a brief illness.

Cinema career
Junior started his acting career with stage dramas conducted by Sirisena Wimalaweera. In his plays, Junior provided both music and singing. One of the most popular theater song "Gowe Ganu Paradai" sung by Junior came in Samudra Devi stage drama.

After becoming a cinema actor, he was the music director of the 1949 film Amma which music was composed by N. Pandurangan. He appeared as one of Pandurajan's supporting musicians with the name B.S. H. De Silva. In the same film, Junior made his film debut with his wife Vasudevi. They continued to act together in many popular of the era, including, Surangani, Ran Rasa, Pancha and Me Desa Kumatada.

Filmography

References

External links
 තරු ජෝඩු

1982 deaths
Sri Lankan male film actors
Sinhalese male actors
1926 births